Saint Joseph Hospital is 468-bed medical center located two miles southwest of downtown Lexington, Kentucky, United States. Founded in 1877, it is Lexington's oldest still existing hospital. It is part of Catholic Health Initiatives.

History

Saint Joseph Hospital was founded on October 2, 1877, by the Sisters of Charity of Nazareth, a Bardstown, Kentucky-based group who managed schools and  orphanages around the state, as well as  the St Joseph Infirmary hospital in Louisville. The Lexington branch of the St Joseph Infirmary was started in October 1877 by Sister Euphrasia Stafford.

In 1998 Saint Joseph acquired Jewish Hospital Lexington, which was renamed Saint Joseph East. In 2003, Berea Hospital joined Catholic Health Initiatives. Mary Chiles Hospital in Mount Sterling joined in 2007. In 2008, Saint Joseph HealthCare and three other hospitals owned by Catholic Health Initiatives joined to create the Saint Joseph Health System. In 2012, the health system merged with Jewish Hospital HealthCare Services/UofL Health to form KentuckyOne Health.

Saint Joseph Health System hospitals
Saint Joseph Hospital - Lexington, Kentucky
Saint Joseph East (formerly Jewish Hospital Lexington) - Lexington, Kentucky
Saint Joseph Berea (formerly Berea Hospital) - Berea, Kentucky
Saint Joseph London (formerly Marymount Hospital) - London, Kentucky
Saint Joseph Mount Sterling (formerly Mary Chiles Hospital) - Mount Sterling, Kentucky
Flaget Memorial Hospital - Bardstown, Kentucky

References

External links

Hospital buildings completed in 1877
Buildings and structures in Lexington, Kentucky
Christian hospitals
Hospitals established in 1877
Hospitals in Kentucky
1877 establishments in Kentucky
Catholic hospital networks in the United States
Catholic hospitals in North America
Catholic health care